Ozanam is a surname, and may refer to:

 Jacques Ozanam (16401717), French mathematician;
 Frédéric Ozanam (181353), founder of Society of Saint Vincent de Paul.
 Ozanam Building, Adamson University, Manila, Republic of the Philippines, named after Frédéric Ozanam.